Golightly is a surname. Notable people with the surname include:

Holly Golightly (singer) (born 1966), British singer-songwriter
Gage Golightly (born 1993), American actress
Holly Golightly (comics) (born 1964), comic book writer and artist
John Golightly (born 1936) Welsh actor
W. L. Golightly, college basketball head coach

Fictional characters
Emilia Golightly, fictional British presenter
Holly Golightly (character), protagonist of  Truman Capote's novel, Breakfast at Tiffany's
Reverend Mervyn Golightly, fictional character in the Endeavour, Series 4, episode Canticle
Sheriff Golightly, fictional character in the 2nd episode of Season 2 of Fringe, "Night of Desirable Objects"

See also
GoLite
GoLYTELY, macrogol solution for whole bowel irrigation

References